Estudios Geológicos is a peer-reviewed open access scholarly journal publishing research articles and reviews in Earth Sciences. It is a journal operated by the Spanish National Research Council (CSIC), with the Geosciences Institute at the Complutense University of Madrid. The current executive editor is Jose María Cebriá Gómez.

Abstracting and indexing 
The journal is abstracted and indexed in:

References

External links 
 

Open access journals
Publications established in 1945
Spanish-language journals
Geology journals